Francisco 'Patxi' Salinas Fernández (born 17 November 1963) is a Spanish former footballer who played as a central defender, currently manager of Club Portugalete.

He amassed La Liga totals of 432 games and 11 goals over 16 seasons, with Athletic Bilbao and Celta, winning two national championships with the former club. Subsequently, he worked as a manager.

Playing career

Club
Born in Bilbao, Salinas emerged through Athletic Bilbao's youth ranks, and made his league debut on 10 November 1982, playing the full 90 minutes in a 1–0 away win against UD Salamanca. He appeared in 14 La Liga matches in the 1983–84 season as the team managed to conquer the double. In the following campaign he became a regular fixture with the Basques alongside another Lezama graduate, Genar Andrinúa.

In summer 1992, Salinas joined RC Celta de Vigo, where he proceeded to post equally impressive numbers in his six-season spell – always in the top division – retiring from the game at almost 35.

International
Over a one-month span, Salinas earned two caps for Spain, both in friendlies. His debut was on 14 September 1988 in a 1–2 loss to Yugoslavia, in Oviedo.

Coaching career
After retiring as a player, Salinas had brief stints at coaching Celta's youth teams and UDA Gramenet, and directing Rápido de Bouzas. As a manager, in quick succession, he also worked with Athletic Bilbao's youth teams, CD Ourense, Melita FC (Maltese Premier League) and UE Sant Andreu.

Salinas achieved promotion to Segunda División B with Rápido in June 2017. One month later, after announcing weeks before he would leave the Galician side, he agreed terms with Burgos CF. He was dismissed on 5 February 2018, leaving them in ninth position and having conceded the fewest goals in the division.

On 22 May 2018, Salinas was appointed manager of CD Badajoz. In June of the following year, he signed in the same capacity with CD Basconia, Athletic Bilbao's farm team (his former teammate Rafael Alkorta was now director of football at the parent club). In December 2021, he moved up to become coach of the reserves following the sacking of Imanol de la Sota.

Personal life
Salinas' older brother, Julio, was also a professional footballer (centre forward), and played most notably for Athletic Bilbao and FC Barcelona. Both made their top-flight debut in the 1982–83 season.

Managerial statistics

Honours
Athletic Bilbao
La Liga: 1982–83, 1983–84
Copa del Rey: 1983–84; runner-up: 1984–85
Supercopa de España: 1984

Celta
Copa del Rey runner-up: 1993–94

See also
List of Athletic Bilbao players (+200 appearances)
List of La Liga players (400+ appearances)

References

External links

1963 births
Living people
Spanish footballers
Footballers from Bilbao
Association football defenders
La Liga players
Segunda División players
Segunda División B players
Bilbao Athletic footballers
Athletic Bilbao footballers
RC Celta de Vigo players
Spain youth international footballers
Spain under-21 international footballers
Spain under-23 international footballers
Spain amateur international footballers
Spain international footballers
Basque Country international footballers
Spanish football managers
Segunda División B managers
Tercera División managers
Primera Federación managers
Tercera Federación managers
UDA Gramenet managers
CD Ourense managers
UE Sant Andreu managers
Burgos CF managers
CD Badajoz managers
CD Basconia managers
Athletic Bilbao B managers
Spanish expatriate football managers
Expatriate football managers in Malta
Spanish expatriate sportspeople in Malta
Athletic Bilbao non-playing staff